Alexander Straub (born 14 October 1983 in Geislingen an der Steige) is a German pole vaulter. He earned a bronze medal at the 2010 World Indoor Championships in Doha.

Straub set his personal best (5.81 metres) on 1 August 2008 in Bochum.

Achievements

References

External links
 
 
 
 

1983 births
Living people
People from Göppingen (district)
Sportspeople from Stuttgart (region)
German male pole vaulters
German national athletics champions
Universiade medalists in athletics (track and field)
Universiade gold medalists for Germany
Medalists at the 2007 Summer Universiade